Vasilevo is a rural locality (a village) in Arkhangelskoye Rural Settlement, Sokolsky District, Vologda Oblast, Russia. The population was 168 as of 2002.

Geography 
Vasilevo is located 22 km northwest of Sokol (the district's administrative centre) by road. Kuznetsovo is the nearest rural locality.

References 

Rural localities in Sokolsky District, Vologda Oblast